Monbulk College is a co-educational secondary school located in Monbulk, Victoria, Australia. The current principal is Mark Quinlan. The college has over 500 students. The latest Victorian State Government (Department of Education and Early Childhood Development) report provides further background information about the school, as does the school website.

History 
Monbulk College was founded in 1963, with the school celebrating their 50th anniversary in 2013.

Building works

Stage 1 
In 2015, the 2015-2016 Victorian State Government Budget allocated $3 million for the Stage 1 redevelopment. The construction of Stage 1 began in January 2018, and was officially opened in May 2019.

Stages 2 & 3 
In 2017, the school received an additional $7.5 million in the 2017-18 State Budget for the Stage 2 redevelopment. In the 2018-19 State Budget, $8.51 million was allocated to the school for Stage 3 redevelopment. Stages 2 and 3 are expected to be completed by the end of 2021.

See also 
 List of schools in Victoria
 List of high schools in Victoria
 Victorian Certificate of Education
 Vocational Education and Training

References

External links 
 Monbulk College

Educational institutions established in 1963
Secondary schools in Melbourne
1963 establishments in Australia